Located in Middletown, Connecticut, the Middletown South Green Historic District was created to preserved the historic character of the city's South Green and the historic buildings that surround it.  It is a  historic district that includes a concentration of predominantly residential high-quality architecture from the late 19th century.  It was listed on the National Register of Historic Places in 1975.

Description and history
The historic district is centered on Union Park, an open green area marking the southernmost extent of Middletown's commercial business district.  It includes properties set on three sides (north, south, and west) of the green, as well as properties on Crescent Street and a short stretch of South Main Street.  Most of these are houses that were built in the latter third of the 19th century, although the area also includes two of the city's oldest surviving residences.  One property, the Caleb Fuller House at the corner of Main and Church streets, is also included in the Metro South Historic District

The most common architectural styles seen in the district are the Italianate and Second Empire styles, reflective of the city's growth between the 1860s and 1880s.  Both of the district's two churches, the Methodist and South Congregational, are Gothic Revival in style, although the former was built in the 1920s and the latter in the 1860s.  Crescent Street includes a number of fine Queen Anne Victorians.  One of the older houses, the Mather-Johnson House, is a fine example of Federal period architecture, which has been owned and occupied by two of Middletown's mayors.

South Green Historic District inventory
Based on the NRHP nomination inventory except as explicitly noted:
 14 Church Street (now 14 Old Church Street), Doolittle's Funeral Home, Queen Anne with hexagonal turret, 1890s, critical contributing property
 (unnumbered) Church Street (now 24 Old Church Street), Methodist Parish House, Second Empire, 1880s (or 1868-1869), critical contributing property
 First United Methodist Church (no address, on Church Street, now Old Church Street), 1936 (or 1930-1931), critical contributing property
 (unnumbered) Church Street (now 8 Broad Street, corner of Church ), Synagogue (Congregation Adath Israel), brick blocklike structure with low dome, non-essential contributing property 
 38 South Main Street (now 11 South Main Street), 1811–1813, Federal style with Greek Revival embellishments, Mather-Douglas House (or Mather-Douglas-Santangelo House), critical contributing property
 29 South Main Street, 1880–1890, Italianate, critical contributing property
 27 South Main Street, 1880–1890, Italianate with belvedere, contributing property
 65 South Main Street, 1880–1890, Italianate, critical contributing property
 63 South Main Street, 1880–1890, Italianate with wrought iron porch, critical contributing property
 61 South Main Street, 1880–1890, Italianate, contributing property
 40 South Main Street, 1880–1890, plain, multi-gabled rambling house, contributing property
 36 South Main Street, 1790–1800, Michael's Beauty Salon, 3-bay, 5 course brick band, box cornice, gable roof, contributing property
 34 & 32 South Main Street, 1880–1890, double bay projections, pediment dormers, large porch, contributing property
 22 South Main Street, D'Angelo's Funeral Home, early 1900s (1902), 5-bay, gambrel roof house with Georgian symmetry, contributing property
 33 Pleasant Street, White-Stoddard House, 1870-1880 (1870), Second Empire, brick, critical contributing property. Now Masonic Temple Building.
 27 Pleasant Street, Hayes-Chaffe House, 1870-1880 (1872-1873), Second Empire, critical contributing property
 21 Pleasant Street, Joseph Rockwell House or Rockwell-Sumner House, 1750, 5-bay, double overhang, Colonial Georgian, critical contributing property
 19 & 17 Pleasant Street (now 15 Pleasant Street), Smith-Stiles House, 1870-1880 (1870-1871), Second Empire, double house, critical contributing property
 (no number) Pleasant Street (or 9 Pleasant Street), South Congregational Church, 1868, Gothic Revival with spire, critical contributing property
 57-83 Main Street Extension, 1870–1880, Second Empire Apartment House, critical contributing property
 55 Crescent Street, Wilcox-Meech House, 1880-1890 (1871), Italianate, 3-story brick with belvedere, critical contributing property 
 49 Crescent Street, George R. Finley House, 1880-1890 (1872-1873), Italianate with mansard roof, critical contributing property
 43 Crescent Street, 1890–1900, 2 story, 3-bay with gable front, side bay projection, contributing property
 41 Crescent Street, 1880–1890, gingerbread, stick style Victorian, critical contributing property
 33 Crescent Street, 1890–1900, very plain Gothic, contributing property
 31 & 29 Crescent Street, 1870–1880, large scale, Second Empire, contributing property
 15 Crescent Street, 1870-1880 (1877), Queen Anne, stick style with barge board and turret, contributing property
 11 Crescent Street, 1900, large rambling multi-gable house, contributing property
 4 Crescent Street, 1880–1890, Queen Anne, critical contributing property
 8 Crescent Street, 1880–1890, Victorian stick style, critical contributing property

Gallery

See also
National Register of Historic Places listings in Middletown, Connecticut

References

External links

New England town greens
Second Empire architecture in Connecticut
Italianate architecture in Connecticut
Gothic Revival architecture in Connecticut
Historic districts in Middlesex County, Connecticut
Middletown, Connecticut
National Register of Historic Places in Middlesex County, Connecticut
Historic districts on the National Register of Historic Places in Connecticut